Dr. Aline Ehrlich, née Buchbinder (26 December 1928 – 5 February 1991) was a freshwater biologist and geologist, recognised for her work on diatoms.

Early life and education

Ehrlich was born in Berlin but in 1938 moved with her family to hide from the Nazis in a small southern French village during the German occupation. She completed her secondary education in Pau. Ehrlich studied many subjects including chemistry, geology, botany and zoology at the University of Paris, developing a particular interest in diatoms. In addition to her position at the University of Paris, Ehrlich was also a biology teacher.

Career
Ehrlich left a position with the Geological Department at the University of Paris and moved to Israel in 1969 to work for the Geological Survey of Israel for 20 years. She investigated distributions of diatoms and compiled the Atlas of the Inland-water Diatom Flora of Israel before she died.

Ehrlich was multi-lingual, speaking German, French, English, Russian and Hebrew.

Publications
Ehrlich, A. (Aline)., Aḳademyah ha-leʼumit ha-Yiśreʼelit le-madaʻim., Makhon ha-geʼologi (Israel). (1995). Atlas of the inland-water diatom flora of Israel. Jerusalem: Geological Survey of Israel .

References 

1928 births
1991 deaths
Israeli women geologists
Israeli biologists
Israeli people of German-Jewish descent
Jewish emigrants from Nazi Germany to France
20th-century women scientists
20th-century biologists
French emigrants to Israel